Events from the year 1886 in Russia.

Incumbents
 Monarch – Alexander III

Events

 
 
  The establishment of the State Bank.
  The publication of Crime and Punishment by Fyodor Dostoyevsky
 Saint Petersburg Electrotechnical University
 Ha-Yom
 Saint Petersburg Electrotechnical University

Births
 January 13 – Sophie Tucker, Russian-born American singer and comedian (d. 1966)
 February 7 – Yehezkel Abramsky, Russian-born British rabbi (d. 1976)
 March 15 – Sergey Kirov, Soviet revolutionary (d. 1934)
 March 27 – Wladimir Burliuk, Ukrainian artist (d. 1917)
 October 17 – Andrej Bicenko, Russian fresco painter and muralist (d. 1985)

Deaths

References

1886 in Russia
Years of the 19th century in the Russian Empire